John Joseph Sheridan (born 1 October 1964) is an Irish football former  football player and manager who was last head coach of National League club Oldham Athletic.

A midfielder, he began his playing career with Manchester City and then moved to Leeds United, where he scored 47 league goals in 230 appearances. He played for Nottingham Forest briefly, under the management of Brian Clough, and then joined Sheffield Wednesday, for whom he scored the winning goal in the 1991 Football League Cup Final at Wembley Stadium. Near the end of his time with the club, he played for Birmingham City and Bolton Wanderers on loan before joining the latter permanently. Sheridan made 199 league appearances for Wednesday and scored 25 goals. He won the First Division title with Bolton in 1997. Sheridan then played for Doncaster Rovers after leaving Bolton and then joined Oldham Athletic, where he spent the last six years of his playing career, scoring 14 league goals in 144 appearances.

He played international football for the Republic of Ireland, for whom he won 34 caps and scored five goals over a seven-year period. Having been included in the Republic's squad for UEFA Euro 1988, Sheridan went on to play one game at the 1990 FIFA World Cup and four in the 1994 tournament.

He became Oldham's manager in 2006, having served as caretaker twice during his time as an Oldham player. Sheridan left the club in 2009, having spent more than ten years there as a player, coach and manager. Later that year he joined Chesterfield, with whom he won League Two in 2009–10 and the following season's Football League Trophy. Sheridan's next role was as Plymouth Argyle manager from 2013 to 2015, and he then had a succession of short-lived managerial positions, including spells at Newport County, Oldham (three more times), Notts County, Fleetwood Town, Carlisle United, Chesterfield (again), Waterford, Wigan Athletic and Swindon Town.

Playing career

Club career
Born in Stretford, Lancashire, in 1964, Sheridan joined Manchester City in 1981, but never played for the first team, before moving to Leeds United in July 1982. He made his debut for Leeds in the Football League Second Division on 20 November 1982 in a goalless home draw with Middlesbrough. He appeared 27 times in the league that season, scoring twice. He was rarely out of the side at Elland Road, and was a hugely popular player with the fans. His best season with the club was the 1986–87 season, when Leeds reached the semi-finals of the FA Cup and finished fourth in the Second Division—their highest finish since relegation from the First Division in 1982. He scored 15 goals in the league, but Leeds were beaten in the FA Cup semi-finals by eventual winners Coventry City and lost the Second Division promotion/First Division relegation playoff final to Charlton Athletic, and therefore stayed in the Second Division.

However, he remained loyal to the club until 3 August 1989, when after seven years in the Leeds first team (during which he played 230 league games and scored 47 goals) he fell out with manager Howard Wilkinson (who succeeded Billy Bremner the previous autumn) and joined First Division club Nottingham Forest for £650,000.

He made only one appearance for Forest (in a League Cup tie against Huddersfield) before joining Sheffield Wednesday on 3 November 1989. It was with Sheffield Wednesday that Sheridan played arguably the best football of his career, scoring 33 goals in 243 appearances. Sheridan scored a "rocket" goal in Wednesday's 1–0 win over Manchester United in the 1991 Football League Cup Final. He also helped Sheffield Wednesday win promotion that season, while they were managed by Ron Atkinson. Atkinson then departed to Aston Villa in June 1991 and veteran player Trevor Francis took over as manager. Sheridan remained a key part of the team under Francis, helping them finish third in the league in 1992, reach both domestic cup finals in 1993 (where they were beaten 2–1 by Arsenal in both finals) and also reached the League Cup semi-finals in the 1993–94 season.

However, Francis was sacked at the end of the 1994–95 season and new manager David Pleat picked Sheridan less often than Atkinson and Francis had. He played just 17 times in the 1995–96 campaign, and made his final two appearances for Sheffield Wednesday early in the 1996–97 season.

Sheridan himself says that he supported Manchester City despite growing up in Stretford, on the doorstep of Manchester United.

He was loaned to Birmingham City for a four-match spell in the autumn of 1996 (where he once again played under Trevor Francis) before finally exiting Hillsborough on 13 November 1996 in a £180,000 move to Division One leaders Bolton Wanderers.

He played 20 times for the Trotters in the 1996–97 season and scored twice as they were promoted to the FA Premier League as Division One champions with 100 goals and 98 points. He played 12 times in the 1997–98 season, as his side were relegated on the last day of the season.

He then made a surprise move to Doncaster Rovers, the crisis-ridden club who had just been relegated from the Football League to the Football Conference. He made eight appearances in the 1998–99 before making a Football League comeback with Division Two side Oldham Athletic, where he would remain for the rest of his playing career. Over six seasons in Division Two, he played 114 games and scored 14 league goals as Latics managed to avoid falling into Division Three but never quite made it to Division One, the closest they came being a playoff semi-final defeat in the 2002–03 season. Sheridan finally retired at the end of the 2003–04 season, a few months short of his 40th birthday.

International career
Sheridan played for the Republic of Ireland national under-19 football team that qualified for the 1982 UEFA European Under-18 Football Championship. In the finals he scored against Austria.

In the 1983 UEFA European Under-18 Football Championship he scored the winner against Belgium.

Sheridan also won 34 caps for the Republic of Ireland, scoring five times. He also scored the 100th Irish international goal at Lansdowne Road in 1994 against Bolivia.

Sheridan was part of the squad that travelled to UEFA Euro 1988 but didn't feature in any of Ireland's three games. Sheridan was also part of Ireland's squads for the 1990 FIFA World Cup and the 1994 FIFA World Cup. He played just one game as a substitute in 1990  but started in all 4 matches in 1994 including a 1–0 win over Italy in the opening game in which Sheridan hit the bar. Ireland won thanks to a goal from Ray Houghton.

In qualifying Sheridan scored one goal against Spain, but as a result of goal difference this was actually an important goal despite Ireland losing 3–1. Had Ireland lost 3–0 they wouldn't have qualified.

Managerial career

Oldham Athletic
Following the departure of Iain Dowie to Crystal Palace in late 2003, Sheridan took over the coaching of the Oldham first team, along with fellow-veteran David Eyres, before they were both replaced by Brian Talbot. On 1 June 2006, Talbot's successor, Ronnie Moore, was himself sacked and Sheridan stepped in to fill in the manager's position on a permanent basis.

On 7 December 2006, Sheridan was named Football League One Manager of the Month. He guided Oldham to sixth place in League One in 2006–07, and their promotion challenge was ended in the play-off semi-finals by eventual winners Blackpool.

They finished eighth the following season, but had made a far more convincing bid for promotion during the 2008–09 season. On 9 March 2009, reports surfaced of a fight involving players and Sheridan at a racetrack, which Sheridan described as being "overblown". Sheridan remained with the club for the next game, a 6–2 defeat at Milton Keynes Dons. The following day, Sheridan agreed to leave the club after a discussion with Oldham managing director Simon Corney. He was immediately replaced with former Oldham manager Joe Royle. Sheridan later admitted that a series of poor results had led to his departure from Oldham.

Chesterfield
On 9 June 2009, Sheridan was named as manager of Chesterfield in League Two. Signing a three-year contract with the club, he brought assistant Tommy Wright and goalkeeper Mark Crossley along with him.

Sheridan's second season with the club saw him bringing in his own players, and on 22 April 2011 a draw between Torquay United and Wycombe Wanderers meant Chesterfield were promoted without even kicking a ball in League Two. On 7 May 2011, Chesterfield were confirmed as champions of League Two after a 3–1 victory over play-off contenders Gillingham in their last match of the season. Sheridan's side won the Football League Trophy the following season but the club's league campaign ended in relegation back to League Two.

On 28 August 2012, it was announced that Sheridan had been relieved of his duties after the team gained two points from the opening three league games of the 2012–13 season. After five weeks on gardening leave, a club statement on 3 October announced that Sheridan had resigned with effect from 18 September 2012.

Plymouth Argyle
Sheridan was appointed manager of Plymouth Argyle on 6 January 2013. "There have been one or two other jobs while I've been out of work that I didn't go for. But as soon as Plymouth came up, a lot of people told me how good it is," said Sheridan, who signed a contract until the end of the 2012–13 season. "I have been in Yorkshire for the majority of my career and it's a change for me. It's a big upheaval for me to come to Plymouth, but I'm really excited." He was named Football League Two Manager of the Month for March after Argyle won four and drew one of their six matches. By the end of the season, the club had won eight and drawn four of Sheridan's 19 games in charge and avoided relegation from the Football League. Sheridan signed a new three-year contract with the club in May. "Obviously, now the hard work starts. I keep saying it – I'm ready to get this club pushed up the league and that's what I am going to try to do," he said.

Sheridan improved the fortunes of Plymouth Argyle in 2013–14, leading the club to a 10th-placed finish in League Two, the first time the club has finished higher than 21st in league competition since 2007–08. However, the season ended on a negative note, as following a 2–1 victory over Sheridan's former club Chesterfield which put the Pilgrims into the play off positions, the team then self capitulated and only won one of the final nine games. This led to Sheridan deciding against renewing the contracts of seven professionals, including former player of the year Maxime Blanchard and Plymouth-born midfielder Luke Young, with promotion the target for 2014–15.

Sheridan's Plymouth finished in seventh place in 2014–15, securing a place in the League Two playoffs following a 2–0 win at Shrewsbury Town on the final day of the regular season. However they were defeated by fourth placed Wycombe Wanderers over the two-legged semi final, with the Pilgrims succumbing to a 5–3 defeat on aggregate.

On 28 May 2015, Plymouth announced that Sheridan had left the club by mutual consent after expressing a desire to return to the north of England for family reasons.

Newport County

On 2 October 2015, Sheridan was confirmed as the new manager of Newport County replacing Terry Butcher who had been sacked the previous day. Sheridan took over the role with Newport bottom of League Two, having gained five points from the first ten matches of the 2015–16 season. Sheridan managed to secure only one point from his first three games, but then took the side on a ten-game unbeaten run and led the side to an FA Cup 3rd round appearance against EFL Championship club Blackburn Rovers in January 2016. He would finish the season with a record of five wins, seven draws, and five defeats, producing 20 of a possible 51 points.

He left the club in January 2016 to join Oldham for a fourth spell. His departure nearly led to a complaint by Newport County, who were unhappy at images which emerged on social media of Sheridan allegedly meeting with Oldham staff prior to Newport being approached. Club director Gavin Foxall wished Sheridan "all the best" but noted that "the manner of his departure has not been right". Oldham officially maintained that they had contacted Newport prior to the meeting.

Return to Oldham Athletic
On 13 January 2016, Sheridan was confirmed to be returning to Oldham Athletic for a second spell as full-time manager having resigned from his position as Newport County manager after just four months. He managed to save Oldham from relegation to League Two.

Notts County
On 27 May 2016, Sheridan was appointed as manager of Notts County on a three-year contract.

On 2 January 2017, equalling a club record of nine successive defeats, Sheridan was sacked for gross misconduct as manager shortly after losing 4–0 to Cambridge United. Sheridan left the club with them just one point above the relegation zone with just 22 points from 24 games.

Third spell at Oldham Athletic
On 12 January 2017, Sheridan became manager of Oldham Athletic for a third time, he replaced Steve Robinson at the League One club. On 25 September 2017 he left Oldham by mutual consent.

Fleetwood Town
On 22 February 2018, Sheridan was appointed manager of League One club Fleetwood Town until the end of the 2017–18 season, replacing Uwe Rosler. He joined with the club 20th in the league having lost their last eight games in all competitions, but successfully guided them to safety finishing in 14th place.

Carlisle United 
In June 2018, Sheridan was appointed manager of Carlisle United replacing Keith Curle. He resigned on 4 January 2019.

Second spell at Chesterfield
On 9 January 2019, Sheridan was reappointed as manager of National League club Chesterfield, returning to the club he left in August 2012. He joined with Chesterfield 22nd in the fifth tier having won just one of their last twenty-five league games. On 2 January 2020, following a 3–0 defeat at Solihull Moors that left Chesterfield in 22nd place with only 17 games of the season left, Sheridan's contract was terminated.

Waterford

In July 2020 Sheridan was named manager of League of Ireland Premier Division club Waterford. He left the role after just eight games in charge of the team to return to England.

Wigan Athletic
Sheridan was appointed manager of League One club Wigan Athletic by the administrators  on 11 September 2020. He only lasted fifteen games in charge before making another move.

Swindon Town
On 11 November 2020, Sheridan was approached by Swindon Town to become their next manager following the departure of Richie Wellens. On 13 November 2020, he signed a contract with the Wiltshire club until the end of the season, but left on 17 April 2021.

Fourth spell at Oldham Athletic
On 22 January 2022, Sheridan returned to Oldham Athletic as head coach with the club bottom of the Football League. He could not halt the slide towards the National League. Oldham were relegated from the English Football League following a 2-1 home defeat by Salford City on 23 April 2022, a match interrupted by an on-pitch protest by fans against the club's owners. Sheridan said he would stay at Oldham  with the aim of an immediate return to the English Football League in the next season. On 15 September 2022 it was announced that he would step aside after their match on 17 September.

Career statistics

Playing statistics

Managerial statistics

Honours

As a player
Sheffield Wednesday
Football League Cup: 1990–91

Bolton Wanderers
Football League First Division: 1996–97

Individual
PFA Team of the Year: 1987–88 Second Division, 1988–89 Second Division, 1990–91 Second Division

As a manager
Chesterfield
Football League Two: 2010–11
Football League Trophy: 2011–12

Individual
League One Manager of the Month: November 2006
League Two Manager of the Month: October 2009, February 2010, March 2013

See also
 List of Republic of Ireland international footballers born outside the Republic of Ireland

References

External links

1964 births
Living people
People from Stretford
English footballers
Republic of Ireland association footballers
Republic of Ireland international footballers
Republic of Ireland B international footballers
Republic of Ireland under-21 international footballers
Republic of Ireland youth international footballers
Association football midfielders
Manchester City F.C. players
Leeds United F.C. players
Nottingham Forest F.C. players
Sheffield Wednesday F.C. players
Birmingham City F.C. players
Bolton Wanderers F.C. players
Doncaster Rovers F.C. players
Oldham Athletic A.F.C. players
English football managers
Republic of Ireland football managers
Oldham Athletic A.F.C. managers
Chesterfield F.C. managers
Plymouth Argyle F.C. managers
Newport County A.F.C. managers
Notts County F.C. managers
Fleetwood Town F.C. managers
Waterford F.C. managers
Wigan Athletic F.C. managers
Swindon Town F.C. managers
UEFA Euro 1988 players
1990 FIFA World Cup players
1994 FIFA World Cup players
Premier League players
English Football League players
English Football League managers
British people of Irish descent
Footballers from Greater Manchester
FA Cup Final players